Herde may be,

Ariane Herde
Herdé language